Rakhata is a rural locality (a selo) in Botlikhsky District, Republic of Dagestan, Russia. The population was 2,909 as of 2010. There are 34 streets.

Geography 
Rakhata is located on the Ansalta River, 13 km northwest of Botlikh (the district's administrative centre) by road. Tando is the nearest rural locality.

References 

Rural localities in Botlikhsky District